Sam Goody was a music and entertainment retailer in the United States and United Kingdom, operated by The Musicland Group, Inc. It was purchased by Best Buy in 2000, sold to Sun Capital Partners in 2003, and filed for bankruptcy in 2006, closing most of its stores. The remaining stores were purchased by Trans World Entertainment, which also runs FYE, Saturday Matinee, and Suncoast Motion Picture Company.

Sam Goody specialized in music, video, and video game sales. Between 2007 and 2008, Trans World converted most of the stores into FYE. , there were only two Sam Goody stores left within the United States—in the Ohio Valley Mall in St. Clairsville, Ohio, and the Rogue Valley Mall in Medford, Oregon.

History 

Sam "Goody" Gutowitz (1904-1991) of New York City opened a small record store on New York's 9th Avenue shortly after the advent of vinyl long-playing records in the late 1940s. Although he did some retail business from his main store on 49th Street, most of his volume was in mail-order sales at discount prices, of which he was a pioneer. He became something of a folk hero among penniless college students as the first successful large-scale LP discounter.

Later, the Sam Goody name was applied to a chain of record stores established in 1951 by Gutowitz. In 1959, a group of creditors took over the company to collect $2.4 million in debts. In 1978, the company was acquired by the American Can Company (later renamed Primerica), the owners of Minneapolis-based Musicland, Goody's rival. Sam Goody continued to grow through both acquisitions and organic growth, including the launch of its website. The Musicland Group was once the largest music retailer in the country, operating at its peak more than 1300 stores, over 800 of them Sam Goodys, and earning over $2 billion in annual revenue.

In 1986, Sam Goody's corporate parent Musicland purchased the then just recently purchased 34-store Southern California-based Licorice Pizza chain and 26 other record stores for $13 million from Record Bar. The Licorice Pizza stores were rebranded Sam Goody the following year.

Acquisition and demise 

Best Buy attempted to diversify its retail holdings by purchasing Musicland in 2001, only to sell it two years later. Best Buy's attempt to transform Musicland into a youth-oriented small-format technology hub failed after two years of ownership. Losses were exacerbated by a decline in physical CD sales in line with the general decline in CD sales, and by competition from big box retailers. Just weeks before Best Buy was prepared to liquidate the entire chain of stores (and after closing several hundred), they found a buyer in Sun Capital Partners, a private equity firm in Boca Raton, Florida, which acquired the chain in a cash-free transaction by acquiring Musicland's liabilities.

In 2002, Best Buy decided to consolidate some of the acquired stores by converting On Cue stores to the Sam Goody brand.

Under Sun Capital, the company closed more stores and tried to get the business back to basics, but ultimately the challenges of competition and lackluster music industry releases proved too much and in January 2006, The Musicland Group filed for Chapter 11 bankruptcy. In February 2006, the company announced the closing of 226 Sam Goody and 115 Suncoast Motion Picture Company stores. Following the closings, the Sam Goody chain was left with 191 stores.

In March 2006, Trans World Entertainment, which had been acquiring their competitors for several years, announced the purchase of 400 Sam Goody and Suncoast stores. Trans World kept 345 of the stores open and closed 55. In late 2006, Trans World Entertainment Corp. began changing the names of mall-based Sam Goody stores to f.y.e., the company's signature retail store. Trans World retained the Suncoast Motion Picture Co. name on about 170 stores.

After a dismal fourth quarter 2006 and a lackluster year in general, Transworld admitted that it failed to anticipate some of the challenges that remained associated with the remaining Musicland stores that it acquired, especially the "Sam Goody Rural" concept located in small communities. As a result, they announced more store closings, many of which were likely to be former Musicland stores.

Trans World has announced their intention to focus on the f.y.e. brand and convert all Sam Goody stores to f.y.e stores in the future. By February 2009, Trans World had removed the Sam Goody brand from its corporate website.  They kept a large store in San Diego branded Sam Goody due to the cost of changing the signs until late 2012.

By late 2015, Transworld had a fully operational Sam Goody in the newly renovated Centre of Tallahassee in Tallahassee, Florida. The last recorded instance of this store was in an Internet Archive snapshot of the Centre of Tallahassee website from April 4, 2016, only to disappear by April 30.

In February 2020, Transworld sold Sam Goody's parent FYE to Sunrise Records for approximately $11 million.

United Kingdom 
In 1990, Sam Goody entered the UK market and established a presence in a number of English towns, such as Milton Keynes, Weston-super-Mare and Stockport, with a "deep catalogue" retail format that included a large amount of "recurrent" music albums and videos. However, whereas this format might have been successful in the United States in the 1980s and early 1990s, in the United Kingdom it came under pressure from a range of price led and established retailers. In 1999, Sam Goody had exited from UK marketplace, selling its stores off to rival retailers. At the chain's height, there were 22 stores and only 14 stores remained when the company exited the UK market.

Photo gallery

References

External links
Sam Goody in the UK

Music retailers of the United States
Retail companies established in 1951
Retail companies disestablished in 2006
Defunct retail companies of the United States
Defunct retail companies of the United Kingdom 
1951 establishments in New York City
Companies that filed for Chapter 11 bankruptcy in 2006